Robert Kenneth Litherland (23 June 193013 May 2011), known as Bob Litherland, was a British Labour politician.

He was elected Member of Parliament (MP) for Manchester Central at a by-election in September 1979, and held the office until he retired at the 1997 general election.

Early life 
Litherland was born to a working-class family in Collyhurst, Manchester. His father was an engineer and his mother was a mill worker. He attended a grammar school but left at the age of fifteen to train as a bookbinder, going on to be a sales representative for a printing company. He was active in the trade union the Society of Graphical and Allied Trades (Sogat) and joined the Labour party at sixteen.

Career 
Litherland was elected to Manchester City Council in 1971 for the ward of Harpurhey. He became chairman of the council's direct works committee, overseeing slum clearance. A believer in municipal socialism, he took pride in the improvements to council housing in the city and revealed a cartel fixing the price of cement.

Member of Parliament 
After Labour's defeat in the 1979 general election, Harold Lever, the MP for Manchester Central, was made a life peer, leading to the first by-election of that parliament. The first MP sponsored by Sogat, Litherland won the Labour nomination and was elected that September by a majority of 5,992. A left-winger, he welcomed Michael Foot's successful Labour party leadership bid and sponsored Tony Benn in his failed 1981 deputy leadership challenge. He would later support Eric Heffer and John Prescott in their leadership bids.

In 1981, a year after the beginning of the Soviet–Afghan War, he made a controversial fact-finding visit to Kabul with two other Labour MPs. After a five-day stay he concluded that Babrak Karmal's government should be recognised but that Soviet forces should leave Afghanistan.

Litherland worked hard for his constituents. In 1982 he protested to ministers about poor conditions at Strangeways prison and in 1983 he demanded an inquiry into poor-quality tower blocks. After boundary changes in 1983, his local popularity meant he was selected for the redrawn Manchester Central seat over frontbencher Charles Morris, whose Manchester Openshaw seat had been abolished. He was re-elected with a majority of nearly 20,000.

He chose to retire from politics when  he reached retirement age, stepping down as an MP at the 1997 general election. This meant that despite spending eighteen years in Parliament he never served as a government MP.

Political beliefs 
Litherland was a staunch socialist and held some radical beliefs. However, he realised that Labour needed to pursue popular policies in order to gain power and that socialists had to co-operate to succeed. He was a member of the Campaign for Nuclear Disarmament and opposed the deployment of troops to the Falklands War. He opposed Conservative Party laws on trade unions and criticised Margaret Thatcher for promoting democracy abroad, such as during her visit to Poland, while suppressing unions at home.

Personal life 
Litherland married his wife Edna in 1953. They had two children, five grandchildren and three great-grandchildren.

He died in May 2011 after living with cancer for ten years.

References 
Times Guide to the House of Commons, Times Newspapers Limited, 1992 and 1997 editions.

External links 
 

1930 births
2011 deaths
Graphical, Paper and Media Union-sponsored MPs
Labour Party (UK) MPs for English constituencies
Politicians from Manchester
UK MPs 1979–1983
UK MPs 1983–1987
UK MPs 1987–1992
UK MPs 1992–1997